Giorgos Daditsos (9 March 1953 – 20 August 2003) was a Greek professional footballer who played as a goalkeeper.

Club career
Daditsos started his career in 1968 when he enrolled in the infrastructure departments of AEK Athens and competed in the youth teams playing in the position of the goalkeeper. He was promoted to the men's team in the early 70's, under Branko Stanković, but he was in the "shadow" of notable goalkeepers and he did not manage to establish himself as a member of the team.

In the summer of 1975, he was transferred to Panachaiki, where he played until 1977. Afterwards he moved to Fostiras for a season and then to Olympiakos Neon Liosion, where he played until 1981. He then signed at Egaleo, where he won promotion to the first division, in 1983. He then played at Atromitos Piraeus for a season, which was followed by another 3 seasons at Proodeftiki. On 21 November 1987 he signed with Atromitos, where he won the Gamma Ethniki in 1988. He played in the club of Peristeri until the summer of 1989, when he retired.

Personal life
Daditsos continued to deal with football as an administrative agent in Proodeftiki, where he served as the General Leader. Professionally, he was engaged in the trade of sporting goods with sales shops in the regions of Aigaleo and Nikaia. He had a wife named Stavroula and two sons, Leonidas and Kostas. The later followed his footsteps enrolling in the academies of AEK Athens, being promoted in the men's team in 1998, playing for a season without making any appearances. On 20 August 2003 Daditsos died prematurely from acute mental swelling, at the age of only 50. Since then and in his memory, the veteran football players of AEK and Proodeftiki have established an annual friendly match which is held at Nikaia Municipal Stadium.

Honours

AEK Athens
Alpha Ethniki: 1970–71

Atromitos
Gamma Ethniki: 1987–88

References

Association football goalkeepers
1953 births
2003 deaths
Super League Greece players
AEK Athens F.C. players
Panachaiki F.C. players
Fostiras F.C. players
Egaleo F.C. players
Atromitos Piraeus F.C. players
Proodeftiki F.C. players
Atromitos F.C. players
People from Phthiotis
Greek footballers
Footballers from Central Greece